The following is a list of football stadiums in Bolivia, ordered by capacity.

See also
List of South American stadiums by capacity
List of association football stadiums by capacity

References

 
Bolivia
Football stadiums
Football stadiums